Jean Major (born 29 September 1957) is a Canadian former field hockey player who competed in the 1984 Summer Olympics.

References

External links
 

1957 births
Living people
Canadian female field hockey players
Olympic field hockey players of Canada
Field hockey players at the 1984 Summer Olympics